Archips crassifolianus is a species of moth of the family Tortricidae. It is found in Gansu, China.

The length of the forewings is 9–10 mm for males and 8–11 mm for females. The ground colour of the forewings is pale yellowish-brown, with dark ochreous brown markings. The hindwings are greyish brown in males and pale yellow in females.

The larvae feed on Picea crassifolia.

References

Moths described in 1990
Archips
Moths of Asia